Evidence-Based Mental Health is a quarterly peer-reviewed medical journal covering all aspects of mental health. It is co-owned by the BMJ Group, the Royal College of Psychiatrists, and the British Psychological Society.

External links 
 

Psychiatry journals
Publications established in 1998
Evidence-based medicine
BMJ Group academic journals
Quarterly journals
English-language journals